100% is a television game show that was shown in the United Kingdom every weekday at 5.30pm from 31 March 1997, the day after the inception of its host television station Channel 5, until 24 December 2001, running for over 1,000 editions. Each show ran for 30 minutes with one commercial break. A Reg Grundy production, it was often billed as "The game show without a host" although it had a presenter, Robin Houston, who also presented One To Win, another daily quiz show on the same channel. He read the questions off-screen throughout the show and was never seen by the viewers nor, indeed, by the contestants. To keep production costs down, the shows were pre-recorded "as live" and in batches, normally over a weekend. The maximum number of shows that were recorded in one day was twelve, although the normal recording day saw ten shows being produced. There was a weekday afternoon spinoff series called 100% Gold which featured older contestants and was presented by Melinda Walker, plus a late-night series called 100% Sex which had questions of a more adult nature. All editions were recorded at Pearson Television's studios in Stephen Street, London.

In its original format, three players would take three seconds or less to push buttons on the set corresponding to the multiple-choice answers of 100 general-knowledge questions.

During its run, a number of one-off specials were produced, usually to tie-in with a themed day or evening by the broadcaster, Channel 5.

Although pulling in reasonable ratings for the channel, it was dropped as part of a station revamp just before 2002.

Scores
The original twist to the show was that, throughout the whole game, the players were told the individual scores (as a percentage of the number of questions answered correctly to that point), but not the player to whom those scores belonged. The scores were given to the contestants after 10, 30, 50, 60, 80, and all 100 questions had been asked, as a percentage of the number of questions they had correctly answered. They were also told whether there had been a change in the lead.

Later on, the rules were changed so that the players now knew who had which scores for the first 50 questions. In all cases, the audience could see who had what score and during the last ten questions the scores were displayed on screen after each answer.

Question fields
Originally, the format of the show was that 100 questions would be asked without an overall subject. In its later format, the subject would change every ten questions, with 1–10 and 81–100 being general knowledge. Every fifth question was a true or false question, and question 100 took the form of a ludicrous fact that was almost always true. In the case of a tie, a 101st question, always true or false, was asked, and if both players got it right the faster player to answer won. All questions, answer options, and correct answers were displayed on-screen for viewers to see.

Winnings
The person with the most questions answered correctly received the nominal sum of £100 and was invited to return as champion in the next show. The players did not speak at all during each episode, other than to state their names and towns at the start of the show (with the champion stating their occupation instead); the winner only responded whether he/she would be able to return.

Transmissions

100%

Specials

100% Gold

Specials

100% Sex

Specials

International versions
Producer Pearson Television (Grundy's parent) brought the show to the United States in January 1999; originally hosted in the 1998 pilot by Mark Henning, the show went to series with Casey Kasem as host. This version offered $10 per correct answer, with a $99,000 bonus to any contestant who managed a perfect score (for a total of $100,000); it was never won during the show's brief run. The show, which aired on only seven stations (in Seattle, Washington; Columbus, Ohio; Dallas, Texas; Houston, Texas; Buffalo, New York; Jacksonville, Florida; and Tampa, Florida) on a limited run, did not last a full season.

In Europe, the TV format was sold in France with the local version called 100% Question and in Italy with the same name of the original format.

See also
 Ian Lygo, a long-running contestant on the show
 Inquizition (a similar US game show that aired on GSN from 1998 to 2001)

References

External links
 .
 .
 Game Show Pilot Light: 100% (US) pilot

1997 British television series debuts
2001 British television series endings
1990s British game shows
2000s British game shows
Channel 5 (British TV channel) original programming
English-language television shows
Television series by Reg Grundy Productions
Television series by Fremantle (company)
1990s American game shows